David Mark Chalmers (1927 - 25 October 2020) was an American historian.

Publications
The social and political ideas of the muckrakers (1964)
The history of the Standard Oil Company with Ida Minerva Tarbell (1966)
The muckrake years (1974)
Neither socialism nor monopoly: Theodore Roosevelt and the decision to regulate the railroads (1976)
Hooded Americanism: the history of the Ku Klux Klan (1987)
And the crooked places made straight: the struggle for social change in the 1960s (1991)
Backfire: how the Ku Klux Klan helped the civil rights movement (2003)

References

2020 deaths
1927 births
21st-century American historians
21st-century American male writers
American male non-fiction writers